Stephan Schmidt (born 19 August 1976) is a former German footballer and head coach.

Coaching career
Schmidt was hired by Energie Cottbus on 6 November 2013 and given a contract to 2015. He was sacked on 24 February 2014 after getting a point from nine matches.

He was appointed as the head coach of Würzburger Kickers for the 2017–18 season. On 2 October 2017, he was sacked.

Coaching record

References

External links

1976 births
Living people
Footballers from Berlin
German footballers
Association football midfielders
Füchse Berlin Reinickendorf players
SV Babelsberg 03 players
SC Preußen Münster players
Hertha BSC II players
Tennis Borussia Berlin players
German football managers
FC Energie Cottbus managers
2. Bundesliga managers
SC Paderborn 07 managers
3. Liga managers
Würzburger Kickers managers